The 1619 Project: Born on the Water is a children's picture book, written in verse, by Nikole Hannah-Jones and Renée Watson, with illustrations by Nikkolas Smith. The book was announced in April 2021 as a companion book to The 1619 Project: A New Origin Story, both inspired by Hannah-Jones' The 1619 Project.

Reception 
The book received a starred review from Publishers Weekly, which noted how "the authors clearly but non-graphically confront the horror of chattel slavery." According to the reviewer, Smith also used different styles to convey different emotions, such as a "saturated palette to create emotionally evocative scenes", while "multicolor palettes illustrate scenes of peace and joy."

Writing for The Horn Book, Autumn Allen praised the poetry and the art, calling the latter "dynamic, expressive, and expansive" and able to show the "emotional journey of a resilient people." In a review for the School Library Journal, Claire Moore, who gave The 1619 Project a star, praised the writing and the art.

Born on the Water ranked #1 on The New York Times Best Seller List Children's Picture Book category, on December 5, 2021. Time for Kids a division of Time  included Born on the Water on the list, "The 10 Best YA and Children's Books of 2021."

References 

2021 children's books
Children's books about race and ethnicity
Works about American slavery
American picture books
Works about British history